Binyamin Sasson (born Saleh Silas; 1903 – 1 May 1989) was an Israeli politician who served as a member of the Knesset from 1951 to 1955.

Biography
Born in Baghdad during the Ottoman era, Sasson made aliyah to Mandatory Palestine in 1937. He became one of the leaders of Sephardic Jews in Palestine, served as deputy chairman of the Committee of Sephardi Jewry, was a member of the board of the World Federation of Sephardi Communities and was president of the Iraqi community in Tel Aviv. He was also amongst the founders of the Israeli Rotary, and was president of the Tel Aviv branch between 1945 and 1946.

A municipal judge, he was elected to the Knesset in 1951 on the Sephardim and Oriental Communities list. Six weeks after the elections the party merged into the General Zionists. Sasson lost his seat in the 1955 elections. He died in 1989.

External links

1903 births
1989 deaths
People from Baghdad
Iraqi Jews
Iraqi emigrants to Mandatory Palestine
Sephardi Jews in Mandatory Palestine
20th-century Israeli judges
Sephardim and Oriental Communities politicians
General Zionists politicians
Members of the 2nd Knesset (1951–1955)